Cazzago may refer to places in Italy:

Cazzago Brabbia, in the province of Varese
Cazzago San Martino, in the province of Brescia